Sinotruk (Hong Kong) Limited is a Hong Kong truck manufacturer incorporated in 2007. The subsidiaries of Sinotruk (Hong Kong) manufactures trucks in Mainland China. Its parent company, China National Heavy Duty Truck Group ( Sinotruk Group or CNHTC), is a Chinese state-owned heavy truck manufacturer, headquartered in Jinan, Shandong Province.

History
Sinotruk (Hong Kong) Limited was incorporated on 31 January 2007 in Hong Kong, a special administrative region of China, as an intermediate holding company for the Chinese Government owned China National Heavy Duty Truck Group (Sinotruk Group). Since 2 April, Sinotruk (Hong Kong) Limited owned the following subsidiaries: Sinotruk Jinan Truck, Sinotruk Jinan Commercial Truck, Sinotruk Jinan Power, Sinotruk Jinan Technical Center, Sinotruk Factory Design Institute, Sinotruk Shandong Import & Export Company, Sinotruk Jinan Ganghua Import & Export Company, Sinotruk Hong Kong International Investment Company and Sinotruk Finance. Sinotruk Jinan Truck itself, is a listed company in the Shenzhen Stock Exchange as SZSE:000951. The subsidiaries were acquired from Sinotruk (BVI) Limited and in turn acquired from Sinotruk Group.

Sinotruk (Hong Kong) Limited was listed in the Stock Exchange of Hong Kong on 28 November 2007. As of 2007, Sinotruk (Hong Kong) and its parent company Sinotruk Group, were jointly the largest heavy truck manufacturer in the Mainland China. At that time, 90% of the sale volume of Sinotruk Group, came from Sinotruk (Hong Kong) and Sinotruk (Hong Kong)'s subsidiaries. Sinotruk Group retained some of the assets unlisted.

Since 10 March 2008, Sinotruk (Hong Kong) became a constituent of Hang Seng China-Affiliated Corporations Index, a stock market index for red chip companies. The stock was removed from the index on 4 June 2012 and re-instated on 7 September 2020.

Business

Sinotruk manufactures cargo trucks and semi-tractor trucks that are used in a range of industries including construction, container transportation, mining and steel production (Howo and Sitrak).

The company and its state-owned parent sold around 125.000 heavy duty trucks in 2009 and accounted for about 20.1 per cent of China's heavy duty truck market. Sinotruk's overseas sales, mostly to developing markets such as countries of the former Soviet Union and Middle East states, accounted for about 19 per cent (FY2007) both in terms of units sold and revenue.

Fuel-efficient trucks currently account for about 80 per cent of the company's production.

Controversies
From 2010 to 2014, Sinotruk exported civilian trucks to North Korea which were converted to military use. Sinotruk denied any wrongdoing in the transaction.

Ownership
In 2009, the German truck maker MAN bought a 25% + 1 share stake in Sinotruk (Hong Kong).

References

External links
 
 

Traton
Companies listed on the Hong Kong Stock Exchange
Holding companies of Hong Kong
Manufacturing companies established in 2007
Holding companies established in 2007
2007 establishments in Hong Kong
Truck manufacturers of China
Government-owned companies of China
Companies based in Jinan